Hamish Brayshaw (9 February 1998) is an Australian rules footballer, currently playing for the East Perth football club in the West Australian Football League (WAFL), who also played for the West Coast Eagles in the Australian Football League. Brayshaw was initially selected with the 68th pick in the 2017 AFL draft, before he was delisted at the conclusion of the 2019 AFL season and redrafted with pick 39 in the 2020 rookie draft. He is the son of former North Melbourne player Mark Brayshaw and brother of Andrew and Angus Brayshaw. He played junior football with Hampton Rovers Football Club and for his school Haileybury College. Brayshaw was again delisted by the Eagles at the conclusion of the 2020 AFL season. Afterwards he was signed as a WAFL-listed player at the West Coast Eagles and made captain of the club's WAFL team for the 2021 season.

References

External links

WAFL playing profile

Living people
1998 births
West Coast Eagles players
East Perth Football Club players
West Coast Eagles (WAFL) players
Sandringham Dragons players
Sandringham Football Club players
Australian rules footballers from Victoria (Australia)